In mathematics, the symbol of a linear differential operator is a polynomial representing a differential operator, which is obtained, roughly speaking, by replacing each partial derivative by a new variable. The symbol of a differential operator has broad applications to Fourier analysis. In particular, in this connection it leads to the notion of a pseudo-differential operator.  The highest-order terms of the symbol, known as the principal symbol, almost completely controls the qualitative behavior of solutions of a partial differential equation.  Linear elliptic partial differential equations can be characterized as those whose principal symbol is nowhere zero.  In the study of hyperbolic and parabolic partial differential equations, zeros of the principal symbol correspond to the characteristics of the partial differential equation.  Consequently, the symbol is often fundamental for the solution of such equations, and is one of the main computational devices used to study their singularities.

Definition

Operators on Euclidean space
Let P be a linear differential operator of order k on the Euclidean space Rd.  Then P is a polynomial in the derivative D — a polynomial whose coefficients are real-valued functions defined on Rd.  In multi-index notation, this polynomial can be written as

The total symbol of P is the polynomial p:

The leading symbol, also known as the principal symbol, is the highest-degree component of p :

and is of importance later because it is the only part of the symbol that transforms as a tensor under changes to the coordinate system.

The symbol of P appears naturally in connection with the Fourier transform as follows.  Let ƒ be a Schwartz function.  Then by the inverse Fourier transform,

This exhibits P as a Fourier multiplier.  A more general class of functions p(x,ξ) which satisfy at most polynomial growth conditions in ξ under which this integral is well-behaved comprises the pseudo-differential operators.

Vector bundles

Let E and F be vector bundles over a closed manifold X, and suppose

is a differential operator of order . In local coordinates on X, we have 

where, for each multi-index α,  is a bundle map, symmetric on the indices α.

The kth order coefficients of P transform as a symmetric tensor

whose domain is the tensor product of the kth symmetric power of the cotangent bundle of X with E, and whose codomain is F.  This symmetric tensor is known as the principal symbol (or just the symbol) of P.

The coordinate system xi permits a local trivialization of the cotangent bundle by the coordinate differentials dxi, which determine fiber coordinates ξi. In terms of a basis of frames eμ, fν of E and F, respectively, the differential operator P decomposes into components

on each section u of E.  Here Pνμ is the scalar differential operator defined by

With this trivialization, the principal symbol can now be written

The differential operator  is elliptic if its symbol is invertible; that is for each nonzero  the bundle map  is invertible. On a compact manifold, it follows from the elliptic theory that P is a Fredholm operator: it has finite-dimensional kernel and cokernel.

See also
 Multiplier (Fourier analysis)
Atiyah–Singer index theorem (section on symbol of operator)

References

  
.
 .

Differential operators
Vector bundles